Arthur Bennett (1 December 1884 – 9 November 1918) was a New Zealand cricketer. He played in three first-class matches for Wellington from 1913 and 1918.

See also
 List of Wellington representative cricketers

References

External links
 

1884 births
1918 deaths
New Zealand cricketers
Wellington cricketers
Cricketers from Wellington City